Hannah Lucy Cockroft  (born 30 July 1992) is a British wheelchair racer specialising in sprint distances in the T34 classification.  She holds the world records for the 100 metres, 200 metres, 400 metres, 800 metres and 1500 metres in her classification and the Paralympic records at 100 metres, 200 metres, 400 metres and 800 metres. Competing for Great Britain at the 2012 Summer Paralympics, she won two gold medals. She won three further gold medals at the 2016 Summer Paralympics in Rio de Janeiro.

Early years
Cockroft was born on 30 July 1992 in Halifax, West Yorkshire. She had two cardiac arrests after birth which left her with permanent damage in numerous areas of her brain, resulting in weak hips, deformed feet and legs and mobility problems and affecting the fine motor skills in her hands. Her disability means she uses a wheelchair for long distances but she does have an ability to walk short distances.

Athletics career
Cockroft competes on the track as a T34 athlete.

Introduction to wheelchair racing
After being turned away from sport throughout her primary education,  Cockroft competed at secondary school in swimming, seated discus and wheelchair basketball.

As a result of a silver medal performance in the seated discus at the UK School Games, she attended a British Paralympic Association talent day at Loughborough University in October 2007. Here, she was given her first opportunity to try an elite racing wheelchair by Dr Ian Thompson, husband of former wheelchair racer Tanni Grey-Thompson.

Thompson went on to coach her for the first year of her career. In 2008 a dance academy she attended gave the proceeds from programme sales at its annual show to help her buy her own racing chair, but when it arrived, its made-to-measure set up was incorrect, so her father, a welder, modified the wheelchair to fit. After returning to the UK School Games that year, and taking gold in her first competitive 100 metres race, she was subsequently invited to join the Great Britain Paralympic Team shortly after the Beijing Paralympics. In 2009, Cockroft participated in her first ever road race; the London Mini Marathon, taking the Champion title in the girls 14–19 age group category.

2010
By 2010, Cockroft was being coached by Peter Eriksson, head Paralympic coach at UK Athletics. She again competed in the London Mini marathon, retaining her title as the female champion and at the Knowsley disability athletics challenge in May, she broke her first World Record in the T34 400 metres, recording a time of 65.51 seconds. Later that month, Cockroft sat her A-level exams, became prom Queen and broke seven more world records, all in the space of eight days. At the Aviva and UK Athletics Awards in December, Hannah received the Best British Paralympic Performance award for 2010.

2011
Cockroft made her senior Great Britain team debut at the age of 19, at the 2011 IPC Athletics World Championships in Christchurch, New Zealand. Here, she took gold in the T34 100 metres and the T34 200 metres. Later that year she made her junior representative debut at the IWAS World Junior Championships, winning both the 200 metres and 400 metres. Her performances earned her a second Best British Paralympic Performance award in November 2011 and honorary lifetime membership of her athletics club, Leeds City AC.

2012

On 31 August 2012, Cockroft lined up in her first Paralympic Games final and won Great Britain's first track gold medal since 2004, and first track and field gold medal of the 2012 Summer Paralympics, winning the final of the 100 metres T34 in 18.05 seconds, a Paralympic record. On 6 September, she won another gold medal in 200 metres T34 in 31.90 seconds, also a Paralympic record. In honour of her achievements at London 2012, Royal Mail issued two postage stamps featuring Cockroft and painted two post boxes gold in her home town of Halifax. She was awarded the freedom of Calderdale at a homecoming event at the Halifax Piece Hall and was named an MBE in the 2013 New Year Honours.

2013
In 2013, Cockroft changed her coaching team to Australian-born Jenni Banks OAM.

On 28 July, Cockroft won the T33/T34 100 metres race at the Anniversary Games at the Olympic Stadium with a stadium record time of 17.80 seconds.  Later that month, at the IPC Athletics World Championships in Lyon, Cockroft retained both her T34 100 metres and T34 200 metres titles.

Hannah was named in the 2013 BBC Sports Personality of the Year shortlist, coming 7th overall. She was the first Paralympian to ever be nominated for the award outside of a Paralympic year.

2014
In March, Cockroft competed in and won a Sport Relief edition of Strictly Come Dancing, dancing with Pasha Kovalev. On 1 June, Cockroft recorded a new world-record time of 3.53.57 over 1500 metres during the Bedford International Games.

In August, Hannah took Gold in 100 metres and for the first time competed in the 800 metres, winning gold at her first IPC European Championships that were held in Swansea. These were the last major championship medals missing from her collection. She later took her fourth title as British Athletics Para athlete of the year and was named Athletics Weekly female para athlete of the year.

2015
2015 saw Cockroft lose her first-ever race after a 7-year domination. At the Newham open meet in July, Cockroft came second to British compatriot Kare Adenegan over 400 metres. She pulled it back later in the day with a win over the 800 metres. In Doha at the IPC World Championships at the end of the season, Hannah retained her world champion title over the 100 metres, and won her first gold medals over the 400 metres and 800 metres, on a world championship stage.

2016
At the 2016 Rio Summer Paralympic Games, Cockroft won three gold medals, retaining her title in the Women's 100 metres T34 Final,  and winning the Women's 400 metres T34 Final, recording a new world-record time of 58.78 seconds, and the Women's 800 metres T34 Final. She broke the Games record in all three events. Upon her return home, she was appointed Deputy Lieutenant of West Yorkshire.

2017 
In 2017, Cockroft raced over the 1500 metres for the third time in her career, breaking the T34 World record with a time of 3.50.22. She now held the full set of T34 World Records for the first time. At the same meet, held in Arbon in Switzerland, she also demolished her 400-metre World record set the previous year at the Rio 2016 Paralympic Games, and her 800-metre World Record, recording a new time of 1.55.73. In July, she returned 'home' to the QEII Olympic Stadium in Stratford to compete in her fourth World Championships. Although she had food poisoning the night before the T34 100 metres final, Cockroft powered home to take gold in a new world-record time of 17.18 seconds. She also became world champion over the 800 metres and 400 metres, making her a 10-time world champion and the most decorated British athlete in World Championship history. Cockroft was named British Sportswoman of the year by the Sports Journalists Association for her achievements. She was the first Paralympic athlete to ever win the award in its 57-year history.

2018 
2018 saw Cockroft's first defeat on the international stage. After topping the podium for seven years, the 26-year-old won silver in the T34 100 metres at the World Para Athletics European Championships in Berlin. She then went on to regain her European Champion title over the 800 metres, after missing the event in 2016. 2018 also saw Cockroft take on a presenting role on popular British TV programme, BBC Countryfile.

2021 

In June 2021, Cockroft was among the first dozen athletes chosen to represent the UK at the postponed 2020 Paralympics in Tokyo. At the end of June, she was in Manchester for the British Athletic Championships where she was first in a mixed classification 400 metres wheelchair race in front of Sammi Kinghorn and Mel Woods. She successfully retained her women's 100 metres T34 Paralympic title after winning gold at the Tokyo Paralympics with a new world record timing of 16.39 seconds. It was also her third consecutive Paralympic gold medal in women's 100 metres event and her sixth Paralympic gold medal.

Personal life
Cockroft left her home and training base in Yorkshire to study journalism and media at Coventry University in 2013. She moved back to her home town of Halifax in 2016 to prepare for the Rio Paralympic Games. She has ambitions to work in television media after her athletics career.

In October 2014 she launched 17 Sports Management Limited ("17"), a sports management company.

She cites Canadian wheelchair racer Chantal Petitclerc as her sporting inspiration. Petitclerc, winner of 15 Paralympic gold medals and formerly coached by Eriksson, has been involved with Cockroft's development as a mentor and advisor.

Hannah hates fish, and believes she may have ichthyophobia.

In March 2019 she appeared on a special Stand Up To Cancer episode of The Great British Bake Off on Channel 4.
In June 2019 she appeared In another stand up to cancer special of the crystal maze.

In 2020, Cockcroft and her partner Nathan Maguire appeared together on a celebrity special of the BBC television programme The Hit List.

Hannah is a proud ambassador of Forget Me Not Children's Hospice, a local charity near her hometown of Halifax.

Honours
Cockroft was appointed Member of the Order of the British Empire (MBE) in the 2013 New Year Honours and Officer of the Order of the British Empire (OBE) in the 2022 New Year Honours, both for services to athletics.
 She was awarded the Freedom of the Borough of Calderdale on 13 September 2012.
 In 2014 Cockcroft was awarded an honorary degree by the University of Bradford.
 In 2016 Cockcroft was awarded an honorary degree by York St John University
In October 2016, Cockroft was appointed Deputy Lieutenant of West Yorkshire.
Cockroft was appointed Officer of the Order of the British Empire (OBE) in the 2022 New Year Honours for services to athletics.

Statistics

Records

See also
 2012 Olympics gold post boxes in the United Kingdom

References

External links

 Leeds City Athletics Club
 
 
 

1992 births
Living people
Alumni of Coventry University
Alumni of the University of Bradford
Alumni of York St John University
Athletes (track and field) at the 2012 Summer Paralympics
Athletes (track and field) at the 2016 Summer Paralympics
Athletes (track and field) at the 2020 Summer Paralympics
Deputy Lieutenants of Yorkshire
English female wheelchair racers
Medalists at the 2012 Summer Paralympics
Medalists at the 2016 Summer Paralympics
Medalists at the 2020 Summer Paralympics
Officers of the Order of the British Empire
Paralympic athletes of Great Britain
Paralympic gold medalists for Great Britain
Sportspeople from Halifax, West Yorkshire
Track and field athletes with cerebral palsy
World record holders in Paralympic athletics
World Para Athletics Championships winners
Paralympic medalists in athletics (track and field)
British Athletics Championships winners
Television presenters with disabilities
20th-century English women
21st-century English women